An okruha is an historical administrative division of the Ukrainian Soviet Socialist Republic that existed between 1923 and 1930. The system was intended as a transitional system between the Russian Imperial division of governorates and the modern equivalent of oblasts.

As a literal translation, the word okruha means vicinity or neighborhood (sharing a root with the words "circle" and "around", a close equivalent is the German term ). This level of subdivision is roughly equivalent to that of a county, parish, or borough. Okruhas were first established in 1918 when the Polissya Okruha and Taurida Okruha were created as temporary territories of the Ukrainian State of 1918.

History

Formation
First okruhas, created just before 1918, were Polissya Okruha centered in Mozyr and Taurida Okruha centered in Berdyansk. Okruhas were first introduced on a widespread scale on April 12, 1923, at the 2nd session of the Central Executive Committee of Ukraine which accepted the declaration "About the administrative-territorial division of Ukraine". According to the declaration, the Ukrainian SSR was divided into 53 okruhas that included 706 raions, thus replacing the imperial division consisting of 102  (counties) that included 1989 volosts.

Reorganization of 1923-1926
 September 25, 1923 Bohodukhiv Okruha changed name to Okhtyrka Okruha after transferring the okruha seat from Bohodukhiv to Okhtyrka
 March 7, 1924 Moldavian Autonomous Oblast was created out of Balta Okruha and Odesa Okruha of Odesa Governorate and Tulchyn Okruha of Podolia Governorate centered in the city of Balta
 June 6, 1924 Yuzivka Okruha changed name to Stalino Okruha after the okruha seat changed name from Yuzivka to Stalino
 August 7, 1924 Lysavethrad Okruha changed name to Zinovievsk Okruha after the okruha seat changed name from Lysavethrad to Zinovievsk
 August 12, 1924 Bakhmut Okruha changed name to Artemivsk Okruha after the okruha seat changed name from Bakhmut to Artemivsk
 October 1, 1924 Tahanrih (Taganrog) Okruha and Shakhty Okruha were transferred to the Russian SFSR
 October 12, 1924 Moldavian Autonomous Oblast was transformed into the Moldavian Autonomous Soviet Socialist Republic with the Ukrainian SSR
 October 28, 1924 Malyn Okruha was liquidated
 November 26, 1924 Balta Okruha was liquidated.
 June 3, 1925 the Ukrainian Central Executive Committee accepted the decision "About liquidation of governorates and transition to the three-level system of administration", according to which governorates were becoming liquidated on August 1, 1925, while June 15, 1925 eight (8) okruhas were to be liquidated as well. After the reform the Ukrainian SSR was divided into 41 okruhas and 680 raions.
 August 19, 1925 Novhorod-Siversky Okruha changed name to Hlukhiv Okruha after transferring the okruha seat from Novhorod-Siversky to Hlukhiv
 September 15, 1925 Zhytomyr Okruha was renamed to Volyn Okruha
 October 16, 1925 out of the Kursk Governorate to Ukraine were transferred several territories:
 territory of the former Putivl uyezd (less Krupets volost)
 Krinichanska volost of Graivoron uyezd
 other two incomplete volosts of Graivoron and Belgorod uyezds
 June 16, 1926 Pavlohrad Okruha was split between Kharkiv Okruha (Lozova Raion) and Katerynoslav Okruha
 July 20, 1926 Katerynoslav Okruha changed name to Dnipropetrovsk Okruha after the okruha seat changed name from Katerynoslav to Dnipropetrovsk
 1926 Cherkasy Okruha changed name to Shevchenko Okruha

Disestablishment

On August 5, 1930, the "News of Central Executive Committee of Ukraine" reported that on August 3, 1930, there was a session of the Central Executive Committee of Ukraine Presidium chaired by Grigoriy Petrovsky where a report by Mykola Vasylenko on the liquidation of the system of okruhas was discussed. In the adopted resolution, the Presidium of the Central Executive Committee of Ukraine generally approved and endorsed the submitted projects from the government commission.

Likewise, the Presidium of Central Executive Committee of Ukraine generally approved the principle and order in the organization of local and central authorities. The Presidium requested that the commission and the Council of Commissars of the Ukrainian SSR, on the basis of the approved principles, develop a draft resolution on the liquidation of okruhas and the structure of authorities, both local and central, in connection with the transition to the rayon system.

List of okruhas

Chernihiv Governorate 1802–1918, 1918–1925 
 Konotop Okruha
 Nizhyn Okruha
 Hlukhiv Okruha
 Snovsk Okruha (abolished in June 1925)
 Chernihiv Okruha

Donets Governorate
 Artemivsk Okruha (initially—Bakhmut)
 Luhansk Okruha
 Mariupil Okruha
 Starobilsk Okruha
 Tahanrih Okruha
 Shakhty Okruha
 Staline Okruha (initially—Yuzivka)

Kharkov Governorate
 Okhtyrka Okruha (initially—Bohodukhiv, liquidated in June 1925)
 Izyum Okruha
 Kupiansk Okruha
 Sumy Okruha
 Kharkiv Okruha

Kiev Governorate
 Berdychiv Okruha
 Bila Tserkva Okruha
 Kiev Okruha
 Malyn Okruha (abolished in October 1924)
 Uman Okruha
 Cherkasy Okruha
 Shevchenko Okruha (initially—Korsun; abolished in June 1925)

Odesa Governorate
 Balta Okruha (abolished in November 1924)
 Zinovievsk Okruha (initially—Lysavethrad)
 Mykolaiv Okruha
 Odesa Okruha
 Pershomaisk Okruha
 Kherson Okruha

Podolia Governorate
 Vinnytsia Okruha
 Haisyn Okruha (liquidated in June 1925)
 Kamianets Okruha
 Mohyliv Okruha
 Proskuriv Okruha
 Tulchyn Okruha

Poltava Governorate
 Zolotonosha Okruha (abolished in June 1925)
 Krasnohrad Okruha (initially—Kostyantynohrad, abolished in June 1925)
 Kremenchuk Okruha
 Lubny Okruha
 Poltava Okruha
 Pryluky Okruha
 Romny Okruha

Volhynian Governorate
 Zhytomyr Okruha
 Korosten Okruha
 Shepetivka Okruha

Yekaterinoslav Governorate
 Berdyansk Okruha (liquidated in June 1925)
 Zaporizhia Okruha
 Katerynoslav Okruha
 Kryvyi Rih Okruha
 Melitopol Okruha
 Oleksandriia Okruha (liquidated in June 1925)
 Pavlohrad Okruha

See also
 Administrative divisions of the Ukrainian Soviet Socialist Republic
 Administrative division of Ukraine (1918)
 Administrative divisions of Ukraine (1918–1925)
 Administrative divisions of Ukraine (1925–1932)

References

External links
  Handbook on History of the Communist Party and the Soviet Union 1898- 1991
  Округ у Радянській Системі ТериторіалЬного УПравління (Okrug in the Soviet system of territorial administration) by Shabelnikov, V.I.
  Okruha. Encyclopedia of Ukraine.

1923 establishments in Ukraine
1930 disestablishments in Ukraine
States and territories established in 1923
States and territories disestablished in 1930
Former subdivisions of Ukraine
Ukraine
Ukrainian Soviet Socialist Republic